is a junction railway station in the town of Taketoyo, Chita District, Aichi Prefecture,  Japan, operated by Meitetsu.

Lines

Station layout

The station has a side platform and an island platform serving three tracks, connected by a level crossing. The station has automated ticket machines, Manaca automated turnstiles and is staffed.

Platforms

Adjacent stations

Station history
Fuki Station was opened on July 1, 1932 as a station on the Chita Railway. The Chita Railway became part of the Meitetsu group on February 2, 1943. The Chita New Line began operations from June 30, 1974. In 2007, the Tranpass system of magnetic fare cards with automatic turnstiles was implemented.

Passenger statistics
In fiscal 2018, the station was used by an average of 1234 passengers daily (boarding passengers only).

Surrounding area
Taketoyo Thermal Power Station
Fuki Junior High School
Fuki Elementary School

See also
 List of Railway Stations in Japan

References

External links

 Official web page

Railway stations in Japan opened in 1932
Railway stations in Aichi Prefecture
Stations of Nagoya Railroad
Taketoyo